Gnyana Sudha Education Society started the Gnyana Sudha Vidyalya in Bidar in the year 2005.

Schools in Bidar district
Education in Bidar
Educational institutions established in 2005
2005 establishments in Karnataka